Spilarctia subcarnea is a moth in the family Erebidae. It was described by Francis Walker in 1855. It is found in Nepal, China (Hong Kong, Zhejiang, Shanghai, Hubei, Sichuan, Beijing, Shandong Heilongjiang, Shaanxi, Jiangsu, Hunan, Fujian, Yunnan, Jilin, Guangdong, Dunbei, Nei Mongol, Guizhou, Gansu, Henan, Liaonin, Hebei, Shanxi, Anhui, Jiangxi, Guangxi), the Russian Far East, Korea, Japan and Taiwan.

References

Moths described in 1855
subcarnea